The 2005 Kent State Golden Flashes football team represented the Kent State University during the 2005 NCAA Division I-A football season. Kent State competed as a member of the Mid-American Conference (MAC), and played their home games at Dix Stadium. The Golden Flashes were led by second-year head coach Doug Martin.

Schedule

References

Kent State
Kent State Golden Flashes football seasons
Kent State Golden Flashes football